Little Prince may refer to:

The Little Prince, French writer and aviator Antoine de Saint-Exupéry's most famous novella and the eponymously named character within the story, or other versions of the story adapted for various media, including:
 The Little Prince (1974 film), a 1974 musical film directed by Stanley Donen
 Little Prince (2008 film), a 2008 South Korean film directed by Choi Jong-hyun
 The Little Prince (2015 film), a 2015 computer-animated fantasy film directed by Mark Osborne
 The Little Prince (play), a theatrical adaptation
 The Little Prince (opera), a 2003 opera in two acts by Rachel Portman to an English libretto by Nicholas Wright
 The Adventures of The Little Prince (TV series), an anime series
 The Little Prince (2010 TV series)
 The Little Prince and the Aviator, a 1981 musical theatre adaptation
 List of The Little Prince adaptations, a listing of The Little Prince story adapted into various media
 Petit-Prince (moon) (English: Little Prince), a small moon orbiting asteroid 69 Eugenia, named jointly in honour of the French Empress Eugénie's son, the Prince Imperial, and as allusion to the eponymously named Saint-Exupéry novella The Little Prince
 Little Prince (chief) (also named: Tastanaki Hopayi and Tustanagee Hopae, died 1832), chieftain and longtime representative of the Muscogee (Lower Creeks) tribe in the United States
 "Little Prince" (Miami Vice), episode of the 1980s undercover cop television series Miami Vice
 "The Little Prince" (Lost), 2009 episode in the fifth season of the American television series Lost
 The Little Prince (EP), a 2016 extended play (EP) by South Korean singer Kim Ryeowook, a member from boy band Super Junior
The Little Prince (Fear the Walking Dead), an episode of the television series Fear the Walking Dead

See also
 The Happy Prince (disambiguation)
 Little Princess (disambiguation)
 Petit Prince (disambiguation)
 Prince (disambiguation)